Cipitio is a legendary character from Salvadoran folklore revolving around the Siguanaba and Cadejo legends.  He is generally portrayed as an  8 to 10 year old boy with a large conical hat and a pot belly.  His name is taken from the Nahuatl word for child: "Cipit" or "Cipote". Some also relate his name to the deity Xipe Totec.

According to the legend he is the product of a forbidden romance between Sihuehuet, goddess of the moon, commonly known as La Siguanaba, and Lucero de la mañana (Lucifer). When Sihuehuet's husband found out about this affair he sought the assistance of the god Teotl. Both the queen and Cipitio were cursed and condemned by Teotl.  Cipitio was condemned to live eternity as a small boy with his feet set in a backwards position, to serve as reminder of the twisted and illicit affair of his parents.  Stories are told of farmers that come to their fields and find the footsteps of a boy, they decided to follow them but eventually get lost because unbeknownst to them Cipitio has backwards feet and so they  head in the wrong direction into the bush.

Cipitio is said to enjoy eating ashes, throwing pebbles at beautiful ladies, and preferring to eat a variety of banana called "Guineo Majoncho". He can also "Teleport" anywhere he wants.

A couple of short stories with this character can be found in the book Cuentos de Cipotes by the Salvadoran writer and poet Salvador Salarrué.

He is the main protagonist on a TV show for the Salvadoran Educational Television Station and is portrayed by Rolando Meléndez, who has played the role since the show's origins. Each episode depicts the problems that Salvadoran children encounter in their communities, families and schools. Cipitio helps them while teaching morals and values.

See also
Curupira
Caipora

Notes

Bibliography
Cordova, Carlos (2005). The Salvadoran American. Westport: Greenwood Press.
Kampwirth, Karen and Victoria Gonzalez (2001). Radical Women in Latin America: Left and Right. State College: Penn State University Press.
Kephart, Beth (2003). Still Love in Strange Places. New York: Norton.

Mythological characters
Salvadoran mythology